Coptodisca magnella is a moth of the family Heliozelidae. It was described by Annette Frances Braun in 1916. It is found in North America, including Kentucky, Mississippi and Ohio.

The basal half of the forewings is pale silvery gray, while the apical half is golden yellow. The hindwings are gray.

The larvae feed on Gaylussacia species. They mine the leaves of their host plant.

References

Moths described in 1916
Heliozelidae